"Baby Can I Hold You" is the third single released by American contemporary folk artist Tracy Chapman, released in October 1988. The song reached the top 50 in the United States, unlike its predecessor, "Talkin' 'bout a Revolution", but it failed to become Chapman's second top 40 hit, peaking at number 48. It did, however, give her a second chart entry on the US Adult Contemporary charts, peaking at number 19 in early 1989. Given the commercial decline Chapman suffered following the release of her second album Crossroads, "Baby Can I Hold You" also became her last top 50 hit until 1996's "Give Me One Reason". In July 1990, the song reached number one in Portugal. Chapman re-released the song in 2001, in support of her first greatest hits album Collection.

Charts

Certifications

Boyzone version

In 1997, the Irish boy band Boyzone released a cover of "Baby Can I Hold You" as a double A-side with the non-album track "Shooting Star". "Baby Can I Hold You" thus became their second single from their third studio album, Where We Belong (1998). The single, like "Picture of You" before it, peaked at number two on the UK Singles Chart and stayed in the top 75 for fourteen weeks. The song was the 26th-best-selling single of 1997 in the United Kingdom and has received a platinum sales certification from the British Phonographic Industry for sales and streams of over 600,000 units. The song reappeared on lead singer Ronan Keating's greatest-hits compilation 10 Years of Hits.

Critical reception
A reviewer from Music Week gave Boyzone's version of "Baby Can I Hold You" three out of five, declaring it as a "teary cover", that "will be a school disco favourite." The magazine's Alan Jones wrote, "Still leading the pack of boy bands, Boyzone are going to have a massive hit with their thoughtful and poignant cover of Baby Can I Hold You Tonight, a fine Tracy Chapman song that somehow never got the attention it deserved. Nicely understated, with Ronan's restrained lead given depth and richness by the pleasing vocal arrangement indulged in by his fellow 'Zoners, and a mandolin." Claudia Connell from News of the World commented, "Few groups do cover songs well-but Boyzone are the exception to the rule. This version (...) is something special and once again proves that few male singers are as hot as Ronan Keating."

Track listings
 UK CD1
 "Baby Can I Hold You" (7-inch edit) – 3:16
 "Shooting Star" – 4:13
 "Mystical Experience" – 4:10
 "Mystical Experience" (remix) – 4:36

 UK CD2 (in limited-edition digipak)
 "Baby Can I Hold You" (7-inch edit) – 3:16
 "Shooting Star" (radio edit) – 4:11
 "Words" (Spanglish version) – 4:04
 "From Here to Eternity" – 3:54

 UK cassette single
 "Baby Can I Hold You" (7-inch edit) – 3:16
 "Shooting Star" – 4:11

Credits and personnel
Credits are lifted from the By Request album booklet.

Studio
 Recorded at Lansdowne Studios (London, England)

Personnel

 Tracy Chapman – writing
 Andy Caine – backing vocals
 Dominic Miller – guitar
 Calum MacColl – guitar
 Stephen Lipson – mandolins, production, programming
 Andy Duncan – drums
 Nick Ingman – orchestration
 Gavyn Wright – concertmaster
 James McMillan – programming
 Heff Moraes – mixing

Charts

Weekly charts

Year-end charts

Certifications

Ronan Keating version

In 2005, Boyzone frontman Ronan Keating released his own cover of "Baby Can I Hold You" as the third and final single from his greatest hits compilation, 10 Years of Hits. It became the second song that he originally recorded with Boyzone to be re-released for his own solo career. In the United Kingdom, the single was only released via digital download and thus it failed to chart. In Germany, the single received a full-scale release and peaked at number 42 on the German Singles Chart.

Track listings
Digital download
 "Baby Can I Hold You" – 3:14

German CD single
 "Baby Can I Hold You" (German Radio Mix) – 3:10
 "Baby Can I Hold You" (Live & Acoustic) – 3:09
 "This Is Your Song" (Live At Wembley Arena) – 4:38
 "Life Is A Rollercoaster" (Live & Acoustic) – 3:47

Charts

Nicki Minaj copyright infringement lawsuit
The song created buzz in popular media in 2018, when Nicki Minaj used an interpolation of "Baby Can I Hold You" in her song "Sorry" featuring Nas. Minaj had used the sample believing it was from the song "Sorry" by Shelly Thunder, unaware that song was actually a cover of "Baby Can I Hold You". Minaj left the song off her fourth studio album due to clearance issues, but the song was leaked to Funkmaster Flex shortly after the album's release in August. In October that year, Chapman sued Minaj for copyright infringement, claiming that Minaj leaked the song to Flex after Chapman denied her team's request for clearance of the song multiple times beginning in June. In September 2020, District Court judge Virginia A. Phillips ruled in favor of Minaj stating that Minaj's experimentation with Chapman's song constitutes fair use rather than copyright infringement. In January 2021, the dispute was settled when Minaj paid Chapman $450,000 to avoid a pending trial.

Cover versions
In 2000, Chapman re-recorded the song as a duet with Luciano Pavarotti for the CD Pavarotti and Friends for Cambodia and Tibet.

In 2021, singer-songwriter Drew Pizzulo released a holiday version of the song entitled "Baby Can I Hold You Tonight, Christmastime" which topped the Christmas Chart, peaked at #2 in Pop and #6 in the Cover Charts on Soundclick.com

References

1980s ballads
1988 singles
1988 songs
1997 singles
Elektra Records singles
Folk ballads
Number-one singles in Portugal
Pop ballads
Songs written by Tracy Chapman
Tracy Chapman songs
Boyzone songs
Ronan Keating songs